Maria Zankovetska (Mariia Zankovetska; Maria Kostyantynivna Adasovska; August 4, 1854 – October 4, 1934) was a Ukrainian theater actress. There are some sources that date her birth to August 3, 1860.

Biography 

Maria was born to an impoverished landowner and nobleman, Kostyantyn Adasovsky, and a Chernihiv city resident (burgess) Maria Nefedova, in Zanky, Nizhyn County, Chernihiv Governorate (present-day Nizhyn Raion). She had many siblings. Maria was a graduate of the Chernihiv City Female Gymnasium.

In 1876, she first appeared onstage in Nizhyn. theater. Her professional career began on October 27, 1882 at the Yelizavetgrad City Theater (Kropyvnytsky) under the management of Marko Kropyvnytsky. Her first role was Natalka from the Kotlyarevsky play "Natalka Poltavka". Later Maria participated among the most popular and professional Ukrainian troupes of Marko Kropyvnytsky, Mykhailo Starytsky, Mykola Sadovsky, and Panas Saksahansky. Her stage name Zankovetska was derived from the name of the village of her birth. Her repertoire included more than 30 roles. A mezzo-soprano, she sang in Ukrainian folk songs.

Zankovetska was an activist for the opening in Nizhyn of a permanent state theater. In 1918, she organized a people's theater "Ukrainian troupe under direction of M. Zankovetska", where she played such actors as Borys Romanytsky, Andriy Rotmyrov and others. Several plays were set among which were "Natalka Poltavka", "Hetman Doroshenko", "Aza the Gypsy". Recognizing her stage merits, in June 1918 the Hetman of Ukraine Pavlo Skoropadsky approved the adoption by the Council of Ministers of a resolution on the appointment of a lifetime state pension for Zankovetska.

In 1922, Ukraine triumphantly celebrated the 40th anniversary of Zankovetska's career. She was the first person in Ukraine whom the government awarded the high title of the People's Artist of the republic.

Zankovetska died on October 4, 1934. She is buried at Baikove Cemetery in Kyiv.

List of selected theatrical roles 

 1882 - Natalka ("Natalka Poltavka", Ivan Kotlyarevsky)
 1882 - Halya ("Nazar Stodolya", Taras Shevchenko)
 1882 - Tsvirkunka ("Black Sea sailors", Mykhailo Starytsky)
 1883 - Olena ("Hlytai or the Spider", Marko Kropyvnytsky)
 1887 - Kharytyna ("Serf maiden", Ivan Karpenko-Karyi)
 1889 - Katrya ("Not destined", Mykhailo Starytsky)
 1891 - Aksyusha ("Forest", Alexander Ostrovsky)
 1892 - Aza ("Aza the Gypsy", Mykhailo Starytsky)
 Ulyana Kvitchyna ("Wedding in Honcharivka")
 Yo ("Loss of Nadiya", Herman Heijermans)

Filmography 

 1909 - Natalka (Natalka Poltavka)
 1923 - Mother (Ostap Bandura)

See also  

 Maria Zankovetska Museum

External links 

 
 Photo Archives of Zankovetska
 Leo Tolstoy asked Maria Zankovetska for a tissue. gazeta.ua. 04.08.2009
 Melpomene of the Ukrainian stage. Triumph and tragedy. To the 150th anniversary of the birthday of Maria Zankovetska. «Mirror Weekly». № 31 (506) 7 — 13 August 2004.
 Profile at hrono
 Profile

1860 births
1934 deaths
People from Chernihiv Oblast
People from Chernigov Governorate
Ukrainian silent film actresses
Ukrainian stage actresses
Soviet silent film actresses
Soviet stage actresses
Ukrainian Discourse Theatre
19th-century Ukrainian actresses
20th-century Ukrainian actresses
Burials at Baikove Cemetery
Recipients of the title of People's Artists of Ukraine